Paul Doiron (pronounced ) is the author of the Mike Bowditch series of crime novels.

Career 
The first book in the Mike Bowditch series, The Poacher's Son, won the Barry Award for Best First Novel and the Strand Critics Award for Best First Novel. It was a nominee for the Edgar Award for Best First Novel and for the Anthony Award for Best First Novel  PopMatters included it in its Best Fiction of 2010 list.

Doiron's second book Trespasser won the 2012 Maine Literary Award for Crime Fiction.

His novelette "Rabid" was a finalist for the 2019 Edgar Award for Best Short Story.

His twelfth novel Dead by Dawn won the 2022 New England Society Book Award for Fiction, the 2022 Maine Literary Award for Crime Fiction and was a finalist for the 2022 Barry Award for Best Thriller.

Doiron is the former Editor in Chief and current Editor Emeritus of Down East, The Magazine of Maine.

Personal life
Doiron is married to poet and environmentalist Kristen Lindquist.

He resides in Camden, Maine.

Bibliography

Mike Bowditch Mysteries 
The Poacher's Son, Minotaur Books, 2010 
Trespasser, Minotaur Books, 2011 
Bad Little Falls, Minotaur Books, 2012 
Massacre Pond, Minotaur Books, 2013
The Bone Orchard, Minotaur Books, 2014
The Precipice, Minotaur Books, 2015
Widowmaker, Minotaur Books, 2016
Knife Creek, Minotaur Books, 2017
Stay Hidden, Minotaur Books, 2018
Almost Midnight, Minotaur Books, 2019
One Last Lie, Minotaur Books, 2020
Dead by Dawn, Minotaur Books, 2021
Hatchet Island, Minotaur Books, 2022

Mike Bowditch Short Stories 
 "The Bear Trap", Minotaur Books, 2014
 "Rabid", Minotaur Books, 2018
 "Backtrack", Minotaur Books, 2019
 "The Imposter", Minotaur Books, 2020
 "The Caretaker", Minotaur Books, 2021
 "Skin and Bones", Minotaur Books, 2022

References

American male novelists
American mystery writers
21st-century American novelists
Living people
21st-century American male writers
Year of birth missing (living people)
Barry Award winners
Novelists from Maine
People from Camden, Maine